Miednik may refer to:

Places
Miednik, Masovian Voivodeship, Poland
Miednik, Pomeranian Voivodeship, Poland

People

Kasia Miednik, a Polish young girl singer